The 2016–17 Loyola Ramblers women's basketball team represents Loyola University Chicago during the 2016–17 NCAA Division I women's basketball season. The Ramblers, led by first year head coach Kate Achter, play their home games at the Joseph J. Gentile Arena and were members of the Missouri Valley Conference. They finished the season 2–28, 2–16 in MVC play to finish in last place. They lost in the first round of the Missouri Valley women's tournament to Bradley.

Roster

Schedule

|-
!colspan=9 style="background:#800000; color:#D4AF37;"| Exhibition

|-
!colspan=9 style="background:#800000; color:#D4AF37;"| Non-conference regular season

|-
!colspan=9 style="background:#800000; color:#D4AF37;"| Missouri Valley regular season

|-
!colspan=9 style="background:#800000; color:#D4AF37;"| Missouri Valley Women's Tournament

See also
2016–17 Loyola Ramblers men's basketball team

References

Loyola Ramblers women's basketball seasons
Loyola
Loyola Ramblers
Loyola Ramblers